Levisa may refer to:

Geography 

Levisa Bay, a bay  in Holguín Province, Cuba
Levisa Fork, a river in Virginia and Kentucky, United States
Levisa (Cuban river), a river in Holguín Province, Cuba
Levisa-Nicaro (or Nicaro-Levisa), a town in Holguín Province, Cuba
Cayo Levisa, a cay  in Pinar del Río Province, Cuba

People 

Fedor Fedorovich Levisa (1767–1824), a Russian lieutenant general of the Napoleonic Wars